KZIZ (1560 AM) is a commercial radio station licensed to Pacific, Washington and serving the Seattle-Tacoma media market.  It carries a South Asian radio format known as "Radio Punjab," with affiliated stations in San Francisco, Sacramento and other West Coast markets. The station is owned by Charanjit Singh Batth, through licensee Akal Media, Inc.

By day, KZIZ broadcasts at 5,000 watts non-directional. But at night, because AM 1560 is a clear-channel frequency reserved for Class A stations KNZR Bakersfield, California, and WFME New York City, it reduces power to 900 watts, using a directional antenna. On July 20, 2016 KZIZ was granted a Federal Communications Commission construction permit to increase day power to 10,000 watts, increase night power to 2,500 watts and decrease critical hours power to 2,500 watts. The transmitter is off 24th Street East in Sumner, Washington.

History
On October 1, 1965, the station signed on as KDFL, licensed to Sumner-Puyallup, Washington, airing religious programming. In the 1970s, it switched to Big Band music.  The station was sold to Kris Bennett Broadcasting in 1986, becoming KZIZ, simulcasting the Urban Contemporary format of then-sister station KRIZ AM 1420.  In 2001, it switched to urban contemporary gospel.

KZIZ flipped to Smooth Jazz on May 24, 2013. The move returned the Smooth Jazz format to analog radio in Seattle/Tacoma for the first time since KWJZ-FM's switch to KLCK-FM in December 2010.

Until 2016, KZIZ was one of three stations in the Puget Sound region that made up The Z Twins, serving the African American communities of King and Pierce County, Washington with a diverse R&B, black gospel music and talk format as well as Hispanic programming.

On March 6, 2016, KZIZ flipped to a South Asian format as "Radio Punjab." Effective June 7, 2016, XL Media Inc. acquired KZIZ for $680,000. Effective August 10, 2017, KZIZ's license was assigned to commonly-owned Akal Broadcasting Corporation, and then assigned to also commonly-owned Akal Media, Inc. effective October 24, 2019.

References

External links
Radio Punjab

ZIZ